Rietfontein is a town in ZF Mgcawu District Municipality located in the Northern Cape province of South Africa. It functions as the Rietfontein Borderpost with Namibia during the day hours of 08:00-16:30, that gives access to and from south-east Namibia via Aroab on the C16 main road.

References

Populated places in the Dawid Kruiper Local Municipality